WBAL-TV (channel 11) is a television station in Baltimore, Maryland, United States, affiliated with NBC. It is the flagship property of Hearst Television, which has owned the station since its inception, and is sister to the company's sole radio properties, WBAL (1090 AM) and WIYY (97.9 FM). The three outlets share studios and offices on Television Hill in the Woodberry section of Baltimore, near the transmission tower that WBAL-TV also shares with WIYY and several other Baltimore television and radio stations.

History

Early history
WBAL-TV began operations on March 11, 1948, from its original studios on North Charles Street in Downtown Baltimore. It is the second television station in Maryland, after WMAR-TV (channel 2). The station's parent, the Hearst Corporation, also owned WBAL radio and two local newspapers, the afternoon daily Baltimore News-Post and The Baltimore American on Sundays–which later merged as the News American in 1965 before shutting down in 1986.

WBAL-TV is one of two Hearst-owned broadcast properties to have been built and signed on by the company (the other being WTAE-TV in Pittsburgh), and the oldest to be continuously owned by Hearst through its various television subsidiaries through the years. At its launch, WBAL-TV was an NBC affiliate, owing to its radio sister's long affiliation with the NBC Red Network.

Early programming on channel 11 included Musical Almanac, Look and Cook and Know Baltimore, along with news and sports productions. In the 1950s, the station introduced Romper Room, a children's program produced locally by Bert and Nancy Claster that eventually became a nationally franchised and syndicated program. Another long-running show of the 1950s was the weekday Quiz Club, co-hosted by local personalities Brent Gunts and Jay Grayson. Baltimore Sun local history columnist Jacques Kelly described it at the time of Grayson's death in June 2000, as "pure 1950s live television ... executed on a low budget ... the genial hosts ... ruled the 1 p.m. airwaves".

WBAL-TV produced several local bowling shows in the 1960s and early 1970s, including Strikes and Spares, Pinbusters, Duckpins and Dollars, Bowling for Dollars and Spare Time. The station even went as far as building and installing several "duckpin" bowling alleys at its studios. It also launched several children's entertainment shows during this period, such as Rhea and Sunshine, Pete the Pirate, P. W. Doodle, Heads Up, and the teen-oriented rock and roll music and the mid 1960s teen dancing on the Kerby Scott Show which introduced its "mod" fashions and "hippie" culture style of rock music to the area.

WBAL-TV has boasted many television firsts, including becoming the first Baltimore television station to broadcast in color, the first station in Maryland (and the eighth in the world) to acquire a videocassette machine (of the U-Matic format); the first station in Baltimore to acquire a mobile satellite news-gathering system (dubbed "NEWSTAR 11") and the first Baltimore station to hire an African-American news anchor and a Black news director.

In the late 1970s, ABC steadily rose in the ratings to become the number one network in prime time. Accordingly, the network began to seek upgrades to its slate of affiliates, which included some stations that either had poor signals or poorly performing local programming. WBAL-TV had been invited to switch to ABC in 1977, but opted to remain with NBC out of concerns about the poor ratings for ABC's then-recently revamped evening newscasts (however, that situation would be improved in the coming years).

Switch to CBS

On March 3, 1981, CBS announced that it would be ending its 33-year affiliation with WMAR-TV, then owned by the A. S. Abell Company (then-publishers of the Baltimore Sun), and moving its programming to WBAL-TV. Among its reasons for making the switch, CBS cited channel 11's strength in local news ratings and overall non-network programming as opposed to WMAR-TV, which heavily preempted the network in favor of syndicated programs, local public affairs and sports coverage; CBS also cited low ratings for WMAR's newscasts. WBAL-TV's first stint as an NBC affiliate ended on August 30, 1981, when the two station exchanged networks–the first affiliation swap to occur in Baltimore. The last NBC program to air on channel 11 until 1995 was a rerun from the evening before the switch of the first episode of Saturday Night Live, with host George Carlin.

Return to NBC
On June 16, 1994, the E. W. Scripps Company, present owners of WMAR-TV, negotiated with ABC to affiliate with its Baltimore station as part of a multi-station deal also involving KNXV-TV in Phoenix and WFTS-TV in Tampa. ABC agreed to the deal as a condition of retaining its affiliations with WXYZ-TV in Detroit and WEWS-TV in Cleveland; CBS was seeking to affiliate with both of those stations, as it was about to lose current affiliates WJBK and WJW to Fox in a separate affiliation deal with New World Communications. NBC originally wanted to affiliate with the longer-established WJZ; that station opted to affiliate with CBS instead. One month later, CBS and Westinghouse Broadcasting formed a partnership which renewed the network's affiliations with Westinghouse-owned stations in Pittsburgh and San Francisco and caused WJZ-TV (channel 13, Baltimore's longest-serving ABC affiliate) and two other Westinghouse-owned NBC affiliates, WBZ-TV in Boston and KYW-TV in Philadelphia, to switch their affiliations to CBS (Westinghouse would eventually acquire CBS in November 1995). After it lost CBS to WJZ-TV, Fox and NBC emerged as contenders for WBAL-TV. Had Fox won, then it would have become the only Hearst-owned TV station to be affiliated with Fox, plus in fact that the station would only allow up to two Baltimore Ravens games at once. NBC however won the bid for the station, citing the stronger sports programs. Largely by default, channel 11 rejoined NBC on January 2, 1995. In the interim period between the announcement and switch, any CBS shows WBAL turned down would air on WJZ-TV instead, forcing WBAL to air NBC programs preempted by WMAR-TV, because the contracts did not expire until January 1995. The final CBS program to air on channel 11 before it rejoined NBC was the made-for-TV movie A Father for Charlie at 9:00 p.m. Eastern Time; this was directly followed by an hour-long program explaining the switch, which preempted an airing of the Chicago Hope episode "Heartbreak" (which could still be viewed in much of the market via WUSA).

Programming

Preemptions and deferrals
As a CBS affiliate, WBAL-TV preempted an hour of the network's daytime schedule every day, as well as half of its Saturday morning cartoon lineup. Channel 11 also did not run CBS' late night programming. Baltimore viewers who wanted to see the entire CBS lineup could be able to view those programs through WDVM-TV/WUSA in Washington, which was available over-the-air in most of the adjacent Baltimore area and preempted little network programming. The station also preempted Late Show with David Letterman in favor of continuing with The Arsenio Hall Show when it debuted in the fall of 1993; in response, CBS arranged for WNUV to carry the Letterman series instead.

Once the station returned to NBC in 1995, the station preempted large amounts of Saturday morning programming, including several TNBC shows, as well as an hour of the network's daytime schedule each day (just like what it did when it was a CBS affiliate) and in its early years, tape-delaying several late night shows.

WBAL-TV is one of the few NBC affiliates that does not air the fourth hour of Today (which can be seen in the area via NBC O&O WRC-TV in Washington).

Sports programming
In 1970, when the then-Baltimore Colts moved to the newly-formed and realigned American Football Conference as part of the AFL–NFL merger of professional football of 1970, WBAL-TV displaced WMAR-TV (which had aired most of the team's games since 1956) as the station of record for the team (as NBC was the rightsholder for all AFC games). During its first season as such, the station provided coverage of the Colts' victory in Super Bowl V in 1971. This partnership continued until 1981, when WMAR-TV became the team's unofficial home station again for their last three seasons in Baltimore (although the station continued to air Colts games in those three seasons, they were limited to home interconference contests). When the reorganized Baltimore Ravens began play in 1996 after moving the old Cleveland Browns franchise to Maryland, WBAL-TV became the new team's station of record, but only for two seasons; in 1998, most games were moved to WJZ-TV. Presently, WBAL-TV airs any Ravens games when they play on NBC's Sunday Night Football and on ESPN's Monday Night Football, the latter being a benefit of Hearst's 20 percent ownership of ESPN.

The station aired any Baltimore Orioles baseball games as part of NBC's broadcast contract with Major League Baseball from the establishment of the new Orioles franchise in 1954 (move of the old St. Louis Browns to the city) until 1981; it also aired all of the Orioles' postseason games through NBC's limited contract from 1995 to 2000. During its time as a CBS station, WBAL-TV also broadcast select games involving the Orioles through CBS's MLB broadcast contract from 1990 to 1993. From 1964 until his retirement in 1995, Vince Bagli was WBAL-TV's sportscaster. His colleagues at the station called him the "Dean of Baltimore Sports".

News operation

WBAL-TV presently broadcasts 35 hours of locally produced newscasts each week (with five hours each weekday, 4½ hours on Saturdays and 5½ hours on Sundays); the station also produces a weekly public affairs program on Sunday mornings called 11 TV Hill.

Appropriately for a station with roots in a newspaper, channel 11 has a rich news tradition. WBAL's newscasts have spent the better part of its history in either first or second place in the ratings. It led the ratings from the 1960s until WJZ-TV passed it in the early 1970s. However, for the better part of the last 40 years, WBAL-TV had waged a spirited battle for first place in the ratings with WJZ-TV. In recent years, WBAL-TV's newscasts placed first at 5, 6 and 11 p.m. However, in the November 2009 Nielsen ratings sweeps period—the first since the debut of The Jay Leno Show—WBAL's 11 p.m. newscast fell precipitously from first to a distant second behind WJZ (by contrast, the 11 p.m. newscast on WRC-TV in nearby Washington, D.C. was one of the least affected late-night newscasts of any NBC affiliate or owned-and-operated station in the country; it continued to dominate its competitors). WBAL still continued to lead at 5 and 6 p.m. until the November 2011 sweeps period. Since NBC took Leno off of prime time in February 2010—in part due to complaints from WBAL and other affiliates about effects on its newscasts—viewership of channel 11's late newscast has often come close to the WJZ newscast. However, since the November 2011 sweeps period, WJZ's newscasts took the lead in nearly all time slots but WBAL is still a strong second.

In 1974, WBAL introduced the Action News format to Baltimore. Characterized by short, usually 90 second, news "packages" and upbeat introductory news themes, Baltimore's Action News briefly replaced WJZ as the number one news station in Baltimore during the mid-1970s. The architect of the success was news director Ron Kershaw, who had come to Baltimore from Texas and was considered somewhat ahead of his time. He brought in talented anchors like Sue Simmons and Spencer Christian but also replaced long-time local news anchor Rolf Hertsgaard with controversial out-of-towner Don Harrison and streamlined the news operation. Kershaw later brought other innovations to WNBC-TV in New York City and WBBM-TV in Chicago as news director at those stations.

WBAL-TV lent then-meteorologist Sandra Shaw to Hearst sister station WDSU-TV in New Orleans on September 1, 2008, to assist with the Louisiana station's coverage of Hurricane Gustav.

On January 3, 2009, WBAL-TV became the second station in Baltimore (behind WBFF-TV) to begin broadcasting its local news programming in high definition. Only the in-studio cameras and footage from the station's helicopter were in HD at the time of the switch. For over a year, most field reports were still in pillarboxed 4:3 standard definition. Most field reports are switched from 16:9 widescreen enhanced definition to 16:9 high definition in March 2012. On March 5, 2012, WBAL debuted a half-hour 10 p.m. newscast on its WBAL Plus digital subchannel, which competes against an hour-long newscast on WBFF.

On January 12, 2015, WBAL-TV expanded their morning newscast 11 News Today to 4:30 a.m.

News Anchor Rod Daniels retired from WBAL-TV in 2015 after more than 30 years with the station.

Awards and achievements

In addition, WBAL-TV became the first Baltimore television station to win a Peabody Award for local news coverage, specifically of their Chesapeake Bay pollution investigation (and the first Baltimore television station to win the award in any category in more than fifty years). WBAL's news department was also awarded as one of the top three Best Television Newscasts by the National Headliners Association, alongside WFAA in Dallas, and WBAL's Boston sister station WCVB-TV. The station has also won regional Edward R. Murrow Awards, the George Polk Award and the American Bar Association Gavel Award for excellence in reporting and journalism; it has also been rated the most outstanding television news operation in Baltimore (by the Associated Press and United Press International).

Current on-air staff
 Gerry Sandusky — Sports anchor

Notable former on-air staff
 Curt Anderson (formerly in the Maryland House of Delegates)
 Sade Baderinwa (now with WABC-TV in New York City)
 Campbell Brown (formerly with CNN, now with Facebook)
 Ron Canada – newscaster (1970s–early 1980s; now working as an actor)
 Spencer Christian (now with KGO-TV in San Francisco)
 Carol Costello (formerly with CNN)
 Rod Daniels (1984–2015; now retired)
 Mike Hambrick
 Vicki Mabrey (now with ABC News)
 Royal Parker (1962–mid-1990s)
 Lisa Salters (now with ESPN)
 Sue Simmons (later with WNBC-TV in New York City 1980–2012; was at WRC-TV in Washington, D.C. 1978–1980 before that; now retired)
 Ron Smith (died on December 19, 2011, at age 70, after a brief battle with pancreatic cancer)
 Julius Westheimer (deceased)

Technical information

Subchannels
The station's digital signal is multiplexed:

WBAL-TV carries a digital subchannel on 11.2, which launched in August 2005 as "11 Insta-Weather Plus", an affiliate of NBC Weather Plus until the network dissolved in November 2008; after that, the subchannel carried automated local and regional weather information provided by NBC Plus until April 2009, when an alternate programming format was adopted featuring local weather information, newscasts and other special programming. On March 5, 2012, WBAL launched a 10 p.m. newscast on the subchannel (which was renamed "WBAL Plus" the previous year).

On July 24, 2012, Hearst Television renewed its affiliation agreement with MeTV through 2015, to maintain existing affiliations with eight Hearst-owned stations that were already carrying the digital multicast network. As part of the renewal, Hearst also signed agreements to add the network as digital subchannels of WBAL-TV and sister stations KCRA-TV in Sacramento, WCVB-TV in Boston, KOCO-TV in Oklahoma City and WXII-TV in Greensboro. MeTV was added to subchannel 11.2 on September 10, 2012.

Analog-to-digital conversion
WBAL-TV shut down its analog signal, over VHF channel 11, on June 12, 2009, the official date in which full-power television stations in the United States transitioned from analog to digital broadcasts under federal mandate. The station's digital signal relocated from its pre-transition UHF channel 59, which was among the high band UHF channels (52-69) that were removed from broadcasting use as a result of the transition, to its analog-era assignment of VHF channel 11. Several VHF digital stations received permission for a power increase later that month after stations experienced signal problems as a result of changing their digital channel from UHF to VHF. WBAL-TV chose to test its equipment before making a commitment.

As a part of the repacking process following the 2016-2017 FCC incentive auction, WBAL-TV relocated to VHF channel 12 on July 2, 2020, using PSIP to display its virtual channel number as 11. WJZ-TV concurrently moved to channel 11, WBAL-TV's former digital channel before the repacking.

Out-of-market coverage
Outside of the Baltimore market, WBAL-TV can be seen on Maryland's Eastern Shore from Dorchester County to Worcester County, and Sussex County, Delaware. Both Comcast and Mediacom systems in the Salisbury, Maryland–Dover, Delaware market carry WBAL-TV along with that market's NBC affiliate, WRDE-LD (Comcast's system in Sussex County, Delaware carries both WRDE-LD and WBAL-TV, as well as NBC's Philadelphia owned-and-operated station WCAU).

WBAL-TV is also viewed in many parts of southern Pennsylvania such as Gettysburg in Adams County, and Hanover and York as well as the majority of York County due to its proximity to Baltimore. In Lancaster County, WBAL is only available in Marietta, Columbia, and Elizabethtown mainly because of competition and prevalence of Philadelphia and local television stations in the area that are more well-known such as WGAL and WCAU.

In Virginia's Shenandoah Valley, WBAL-TV can be seen in Frederick, Clarke and Warren counties along with the independent city of Winchester.

The station also live streams its newscasts on the internet several times a day.

See also 
Bernard H. Paul – Paul's Puppets children program host for 10 years

References

External links
WBALTV.com (Official website)

BAL-TV
NBC network affiliates
MeTV affiliates
Story Television affiliates
TheGrio affiliates
Television channels and stations established in 1948
National Football League primary television stations
Woodberry, Baltimore
Hearst Television
Peabody Award winners
1948 establishments in Maryland
Preakness Stakes